Paul Francis Tanner (January 15, 1905 – July 29, 1994) was an American prelate of the Roman Catholic Church who served as the seventh bishop of the Diocese of St. Augustine in Florida from 1968 to 1979.

Biography

Early life 
Paul Tanner was born on January 15, 1905, in Peoria, Illinois, to Frank J. and Laura Margaret (née McGowan) Tanner. He and his family later moved to Milwaukee, Wisconsin, where he attended Marquette University. He began his studies for the priesthood at Kenrick Seminary in St. Louis, Missouri, and continued at St. Francis Seminary in Milwaukee.

Priesthood 
Tanner was ordained into the priesthood by Cardinal Samuel Stritch for the Archdiocese of Milwaukee on May 30, 1931. He earned a Bachelor of Sacred Theology degree from the Catholic University of America in 1933.Returning to Milwaukee, Tanner served as a chaplain and professor of religion at St. Mary's Provincial Motherhouse and as a curate at Immaculate Conception Parish. From 1936 to 1941, he was the archbishop's secretary for Catholic Action and Catechetics.

In 1941, Tanner joined the National Catholic Welfare Conference (NCWC) where he served as assistant director of the Youth Department.  He became director of that department in 1942 . Tanner was appointed assistant general secretary of the NCWC in 1945.  He was raised to the ranks of papal chamberlain in 1948 and domestic prelate in 1954.In 1958, Tanner became NCWC director, staying in that position until 1968. In this position, he executed and coordinated the policies set by the body of the nation's Catholic bishops.

Titular Bishop of Lamasba 
On October 18, 1965, Tanner was appointed titular Bishop of Lamasba by Pope Paul VI. He was consecrated on December 21, 1965, by Archbishop Egidio Vagnozzi, with Archbishops William Cousins and Patrick O'Boyle serving as co-consecrators. He was the first priest to become a bishop while holding the office of general secretary.

Bishop of St. Augustine 
On February 15, 1968, Paul VI named Tanner as the seventh bishop of the Diocese of St. Augustine. His installation took place at the Cathedral of St. Augustine on March 27, 1968, a ceremony attended by Archbishops Luigi Raimondi and Coleman Carroll, representatives of the Protestant and Jewish communities, and Florida Governor Claude R. Kirk, Jr. Following the unexpected death of Pope John Paul I, Tanner reacted with "shock and surprise, even horror...It's a reminder that we are just one heartbeat away from eternity." 

Tanner's resignation as bishop of St. Augustine was accepted by Pope John Paul II on April 21, 1979. Paul Tanner died at All Saints Nursing Home in Jacksonville, Florida, at age 89. He is buried at St. Mary Parish Cemetery in Hales Corners, Wisconsin.

References

 

1905 births
1994 deaths
Marquette University alumni
Kenrick–Glennon Seminary alumni
St. Francis Seminary (Wisconsin) alumni
Catholic University of America alumni
People from Peoria, Illinois
Roman Catholic bishops of Saint Augustine
20th-century Roman Catholic bishops in the United States
Roman Catholic Archdiocese of Milwaukee
Catholics from Illinois